Yahia Al-Shehri (born December 13, 1985) is a Saudi football player who plays a goalkeeper for Al-Sharq.

References

1985 births
Living people
People from Riyadh Province
Saudi Arabian footballers
Al-Shoulla FC players
Sdoos Club players
Al-Wehda Club (Mecca) players
Al-Hazem F.C. players
Al-Kawkab FC players
Al-Kholood Club players
Tuwaiq Club players
Al-Sharq Club players
Saudi First Division League players
Saudi Professional League players
Saudi Second Division players
Association football goalkeepers